This page is a list of royal governors of Brittany during the Ancien Régime.

Nominoe (9th century)
Enguerrand VII, Lord of Coucy (1380–?)
Jean de Laval, husband of Françoise de Foix (16th century)
Jean IV de Brosse (16th century)
Louis III de Bourbon, Duke of Montpensier (1569–1582)
Philippe Emmanuel, Duke of Mercœur (1582–1598)
César de Bourbon, Duke of Vendôme (1608–1626)
Armand-Jean du Plessis, Cardinal Richelieu (1626–1642)
François Louis de Rousselet, Marquis de Châteaurenault (1704–?)
Louis-Alexandre de Bourbon, Comte de Toulouse (?–1737)
Louis Jean Marie de Bourbon, Duke of Penthièvre (1737–?)
Emmanuel-Armand de Richelieu, Duke of Aiguillon (1753 – c. 1770)

History of Brittany
Politics of Brittany